"Lovin' Her Was Easier (than Anything I'll Ever Do Again)" is a song written, composed, first recorded, and first released by Kris Kristofferson. It was also recorded and released by Roger Miller, who included it on his album The Best of Roger Miller and released it as a single in July 1971. Ten years later, it was recorded by Tompall & the Glaser Brothers for the album Lovin' Her Was Easier.

Lyrics content
The narrator describes a lover in somewhat nostalgic terms, using images drawn from nature and references to inter-personal intimacy. As originally performed by Kristofferson, it is in the key of C major.

Kris Kristofferson version
Kristofferson recorded the song on his 1971 album for Monument Records, The Silver Tongued Devil and I.

Kristofferson's rendition of the song was not promoted to country music radio. It reached 26 on the Billboard Hot 100 and 4 on Hot Adult Contemporary Tracks. In Canada, it reached 21 on the RPM Top Singles charts  and 8 on that same publication's Adult Contemporary list.

Roger Miller version

Miller's version of the song entered the Hot Country Singles chart in August 1971. The song spent eleven weeks on that chart and peaked at 28. In Canada, the song debuted at 50 on the RPM Country Tracks charts dated for September 11, 1971, peaking at 8 on the chart week of October 16.

Tompall & the Glaser Brothers version

Tompall & the Glaser Brothers recorded the song in 1981. This was the group's third single following its 1980 reunion, as frontman Tompall Glaser had departed the group in 1973 for a solo career. Released in mid-1981, this version of "Lovin' Her Was Easier" went on to become the group's highest-charting single. It was also the title track of the Glaser brothers's reunion album, Lovin' Her Was Easier. Following the release of this song, the Glaser brothers recorded only four more cuts for Elektra before disbanding a second time.

Chart performance
Tompall & the Glaser Brothers' rendition of the song spent sixteen weeks on the Billboard country music chart. The song reached a peak of number 2 on that chart, holding the position for two weeks. It also reached a number 2 peak on the RPM country singles charts.

Mark Chesnutt version
In 2010, Mark Chesnutt included his version of the song on his album Outlaw, an album which comprises covers of songs recorded by "outlaw" country music artists. His version was released as the first single from it. Chesnutt told LimeWire that, although he was familiar with both Kristofferson's and the Glaser Brothers's renditions of the songs, he "wasn't a big fan of the song" until he heard Waylon Jennings sing it. (Jennings recorded the song on his 1971 album The Taker/Tulsa.)

Other versions
 Waylon Jennings recorded the song for his 1971 album The Taker / Tulsa
 Billie Jo Spears recorded the song as "Loving him was easier (than anything I'll ever do again)" in 1977 for her album If you want me
 Nana Mouskouri recorded the song - also as "Loving him was easier (than anything I'll ever do again)" - in 1982 for her album Song for Liberty
 Willie Nelson and Dyan Cannon recorded the song as "Loving Her Was Easier (Than Anything I'll Ever Do Again)" for the film Honeysuckle Rose
 Anita Carter with Billy Sanford (gt) Recorded 29 January 1971
 Skeeter Davis with Vocal Accompaniment by The Jordanaires and The Nashville Edition, 1972
 Billy Ray Cyrus recorded the song for his 2016 album Thin Line

References

1971 singles
1981 singles
2010 singles
Mark Chesnutt songs
Waylon Jennings songs
Kris Kristofferson songs
Roger Miller songs
Tompall & the Glaser Brothers songs
Songs written by Kris Kristofferson
Song recordings produced by Jimmy Bowen
Song recordings produced by Fred Foster
1971 songs
Monument Records singles